Louise Florence Pétronille Tardieu d'Esclavelles d'Épinay (11 March 1726 – 17 April 1783), better known as Mme d'Épinay, was a French writer, a saloniste and woman of fashion, known on account of her liaisons with Friedrich Melchior, Baron von Grimm, and Jean-Jacques Rousseau, who gives unflattering reports of her in his Confessions, as well as her acquaintanceship with Denis Diderot, Jean le Rond d'Alembert, Baron d'Holbach and other French men of letters during the Enlightenment. She was also one of many women referenced in Simone de Beauvoir's The Second Sex as an example of noble expansion of women's rights during the 18th century.

Early life
Louise d'Épinay was born at the fortress of Valenciennes. She was the daughter of Tardieu d'Esclavelles, a brigadier of infantry and commanding officer, and Florence-Angélique Prouveur. After her father was killed in battle when she was ten, she was sent to Paris in the care of her aunt Marie-Josèphe Prouveur who was married to Louis-Denis de La Live de Bellegarde, an immensely wealthy fermier-général, a collector-general of taxes; treated to the stultifying education that was a girl's lot, on december 23rd 1745 she married her cousin Denis Joseph de La Live d'Épinay, who was made a fermier-général. The marriage was at once an unhappy one; and the prodigality, dissipation and infidelities of her husband justified her in obtaining a formal separation of assets in May 1749. She settled in the Château of La Chevrette in the valley of Montmorency, a few miles north of Paris, and there received a number of distinguished visitors.

Liaisons
Conceiving a strong attachment for Jean-Jacques Rousseau, she furnished for him in 1756 in the valley of Montmorency a cottage which she named the Hermitage, and in this retreat he found for a time the quiet and natural rural pleasures he praised so highly. Rousseau, in his Confessions, asserted that the inclination was all on her side; but as, after her visit to Geneva (1757–59), Rousseau became her bitter enemy, little weight can be given to his statements on this point.

Her intimacy with Grimm, which began in 1755, marks a turning-point in her life, for under his influence she escaped from the somewhat compromising conditions of her life at La Chevrette. In 1757–1759 she paid a long visit to Geneva, where she was a constant guest of Voltaire. In Grimm's absence from France (1775–1776), Madame d'Épinay continued, under the superintendence of Diderot, the correspondence he had begun with various European sovereigns. She spent most of her later life at La Briche, a small house near La Chevrette, in the society of Grimm and of a small circle of men of letters.

L'Histoire de Madame de Montbrillant
Her pseudo-memoires are written in the form of a sort of autobiographic romance, L'Histoire de Madame de Montbrillant, begun when she was thirty but never published in her lifetime. It intersperses fictionalized set pieces exhibiting the sensibilité of the earliest generation of Romantics, with genuine letters and autobiographical material. Bequeathed to Baron Grimm, a mangled version of the manuscript was edited by J. P. A. Parison and J. C. Brunet (Paris, 1818) as Mémoires et correspondance de Madame d'Épinay with all the names changed to identify the supposed originals: Madame d'Épinay figures in it as Madame de Montbrillant, and René is generally recognized as Rousseau, Volx as Grimm, Gamier as Diderot, who is sometimes credited with major interventions in the text. The work has had a checkered career since. The only accurate edition is George Roth, ed. Les Pseudo-mémoires de Madame d'Épinay, 3 vols., 1951.

Other works
Her Conversations d'Émilie, a dialogue recollecting the education of her granddaughter, Émilie de Belsunce, was published in 1774. The , was published at Paris (1818) from a manuscript which she had bequeathed to Grimm.

Two anonymous works, Lettres à mon fils (Geneva, 1758) and Mes moments heureux (Geneva, 1759), are also by Madame d'Épinay.

In January 1783, three months before her death, she was awarded the Prix Monyon, recently established by the Académie to honour the author of the "book published in the current year that might be of most benefit to society"; it was her Conversations d'Émilie (1774).

Issue
 Louis-Joseph de La Live d'Épinay (25 September 1746 - 10 April 1813), a militar, editor and musician.
 Françoise-Suzanne-Thérèse de La Live d'Épinay (24 August 1747 - 3 June 1748), died in infancy.
 Angélique-Louise-Charlotte de La Live d'Épinay (1 August 1749 - 1 June 1824), recognized by Denis d'Épinay as his own, but she probably was a product of her mother's affair with Louis Dupin de Francueil.
 Jean-Claude Leblanc de Beaulieu (29 May 1753 - 13 July 1825), also a child of Louis Dupin, he was sent to the countryside and entered in church. He later was Bishop of Soissons and Arles.

See also

Conversation tart

Notes

Sources

1726 births
1783 deaths
18th-century French writers
18th-century French women writers
18th century in Geneva
People from Valenciennes
French memoirists
Denis Diderot
French salon-holders
French women memoirists
18th-century memoirists